La malavita attacca... la polizia risponde! (The Criminals Attack, The Police Respond) is a 1977 Italian poliziottesco film directed by Mario Caiano.

Cast 

Leonard Mann: Commissioner Baldi 
John Steiner: Rudy
Maria Rosaria Omaggio: Laura Olivieri 
Chris Avram: Prof. Salviati aka 'The Prince' 
Ettore Manni: Rampelli  
Liana Trouche: Irene Baldi 
Corrado Gaipa: the Doctor

Release
La malavita attacca... la polizia risponde was distributed in Italy by Capitol Film and released on August 24, 1977. It grossed a total of 692,879,780 Italian lire. It was director Mario Caiano's last film released theatrically.

Notes

References

External links

1977 films
1970s crime films
Films directed by Mario Caiano
Poliziotteschi films
Films scored by Lallo Gori
1970s Italian films